Cédric Collet (born 7 March 1984 in Brétigny-sur-Orge, Essonne) is a French football (soccer) midfielder who currently plays for US Créteil-Lusitanos. Collet previously played for Standard Liège in Belgium and S.C. Beira-Mar in Portugal.

International career
Collet made his debut for Guadeloupe in an October 2008 Caribbean Cup match against the Cayman Islands. He scored in his second game against Grenada.

References

External links 

1984 births
Living people
People from Brétigny-sur-Orge
French people of Guadeloupean descent
French footballers
Guadeloupean footballers
Association football forwards
CS Sedan Ardennes players
Tours FC players
Stade Brestois 29 players
Stade de Reims players
R.A.E.C. Mons players
Standard Liège players
S.C. Beira-Mar players
US Créteil-Lusitanos players
Belgian Pro League players
Ligue 2 players
Primeira Liga players
Expatriate footballers in Belgium
Expatriate footballers in Portugal
2011 CONCACAF Gold Cup players
SO Romorantin players
Footballers from Essonne
Guadeloupe international footballers